The early-twentieth-century British composer Gerald Finzi (1901–1956) is recognized largely for several song cycles, setting texts from a wide selection English poets, including Thomas Traherne, William Shakespeare, John Milton, Christina Rossetti, Thomas Hardy, Robert Bridges and Edmund Blunden.  However, his oeuvre includes well-regarded concerti for clarinet and cello, choral works, works for string orchestra, and chamber music.

Born in London, Finzi was of German Jewish and Italian Jewish descent.  However, the style of his compositions places him as among the most characteristically "English" composers of his generation. Additionally, despite being agnostic, he wrote a significant amount of inspired and imposing Christian choral music that remains consistently in the performance repertoire.

List of compositions by opus number
The most common method of numbering Finzi's works is by opus number as assigned by his publishers during his lifetime.

References

Notes

Further reading
 Banfield, Stephen. Gerald Finzi: An English Composer (London: Faber, 1997) 
 Dressler, John C. Gerald Finzi: A Bio-Bibliography (Westport, Connecticut: Greenwood Press, 1997) 
 Jordan, Rolf. The Clock of the Years: A Gerald and Joy Finzi Anthology (Lichfield, Staffordshire: Chosen Press, 2007) 
 McVeagh, Diana. Gerald Finzi: His Life and Music (Woodbridge, Suffolk, England: Boydell & Brewer, 2006)

External links
The official Gerald Finzi website, created for the composer's family and including the latest news of concerts featuring Finzi's works.
Gerald Finzi page on the website of his publisher Boosey & Hawkes, including a complete list of works published by Boosey & Hawkes and a discography.
The Finzi Trust, the official Finzi Trust website: listen to Finzi's music and read about his life and works, the Trust's work and the Finzi Travel Scholarships.

 
Finzi, Gerald